Back to Black is an upcoming biographical film directed by Sam Taylor-Johnson and written by Matt Greenhalgh.  It is based on the life of British singer-songwriter Amy Winehouse and stars Marisa Abela as the leading role, while Jack O'Connell, Eddie Marsan, Juliet Cowan and Lesley Manville co-star.

Following the death of Winehouse in 2011, several filmmakers attempted to create biopic projects but none of them progressed. In 2018, Winehouse's estate announced they had signed a deal for a biopic about her life and career. By July 2022, StudioCanal UK moved forward with production and filming started in London in January 2023.

Premise
The film will delve into the life and career of Winehouse, beginning with her early days in the early 2000's as a North London jazz musician and culminating in her rise to fame as a Grammy-winning singer with hit songs like "Rehab" and  "Back to Black".

Cast
 Marisa Abela as Amy Winehouse

 Jack O'Connell as Blake Fielder-Civil
 Eddie Marsan as Mitch Winehouse
 Juliet Cowan as Janis Winehouse-Collins
 Lesley Manville as Cynthia Winehouse

Production

Development 
After the death of Winehouse in 2011, filmmakers attempted to create a feature biopic with various projects, but none moved forward. One project included one in 2015 from Lotus Entertainment with Noomi Rapace attached to star.  In October 2018, it was announced that Winehouse's estate had signed a deal to make a biopic about her life and career. In July 2022, Deadline Hollywood reported that StudioCanal UK was moving forward with a feature film entitled Back To Black portraying Winehouse's life and music career. Sam Taylor-Johnson directed from a script by Matt Greenhalgh. The film will feature many of Winehouse's songs from Universal Music Group, Sony Music Publishing. Back to Black is an American and British co-production with StudioCanal UK, Focus Features and Monumental Pictures.

Casting
In January 2023, it was reported that Marisa Abela would star as Winehouse. Jack O'Connell, Eddie Marsan and Lesley Manville were added to the cast later that month. O'Connell portrays , Amy's husband from 2007 to 2009. Marsan and Manville play Amy's father and grandmother, Mitch Winehouse and Cynthia Winehouse, respectively. Juliet Cowan portrays Amy's mother, Janis Winehouse-Collins.

Filming
Principal photography commenced in January 2023 in London, with some scenes being filmed at Ronnie Scott's Jazz Club, outside Winehouse's first flat in Camden Town and at Primrose Hill. In February, scenes were shot inside the Metropolis Studios in Chiswick.

Release
Back to Black will be distributed by Focus Features in the United States, with StudioCanal UK handling the United Kingdom distribution.

References

External links
 
 
 
 

Upcoming films
Films directed by Sam Taylor-Wood
2020s biographical films
Biographical films about musicians
English-language films
American films based on actual events
British films based on actual events
2020s British films
2020s American films
Films produced by Alison Owen
Focus Features films
StudioCanal films
Amy Winehouse
Films shot in London